Desert Rose Academy Charter School is a public charter high school in Tucson, Arizona.

References

Charter schools in Arizona
Public high schools in Arizona
Schools in Tucson, Arizona
Schools in Pima County, Arizona